Parliamentary elections were held in Uruguay on 22 January 1905 to elect all members of the Chamber of Representatives. The elections had originally been scheduled for November 1904, but were postponed in the aftermath of the Saravia revolt, which had culminated in the Battle of Masoller in September 1904.

Electoral system
Suffrage was limited to literate men. Voting was not secret, as voters had to sign their ballot paper.

Results

References

Uruguay
Parliamentary
Elections in Uruguay
Election and referendum articles with incomplete results